Zambia made its Paralympic Games début at the 1996 Summer Paralympics in Atlanta, United States. The country's delegation consisted in a single competitor, wheelchair athlete Lango Sinkamba.

Athletics

Sinkamba had been due to compete in three events, but ultimately withdrew from two of them and focused all his efforts on the marathon. He completed it, but finished 56th and last, over half an hour behind Ecuador's Angel Quevedo in 55th - and more than an hour and a half behind Franz Nietlispach of Switzerland, who took gold and set a Paralympic record with a time of 1:29:44.

See also
Zambia at the Paralympics
Zambia at the 1996 Summer Olympics

References

External links
International Paralympic Committee

Nations at the 1996 Summer Paralympics
2008
Paralympics